Papilio cyproeofila, the common white-banded swallowtail, is a species of swallowtail butterfly from the genus Papilio that is found in Guinea, Sierra Leone, Liberia, Ivory Coast, Ghana, Togo and Nigeria.

The larvae feed on Piper species.

Subspecies 
Papilio cyproeofila cyproeofila (Guinea, Sierra Leone, Liberia, Ivory Coast, Ghana, Togo, western Nigeria)
Papilio cyproeofila praecyola Suffert, 1904  (eastern Nigeria, Cameroon, Central African Republic)

Taxonomy

It is a member of the zenobia species group. In the zenobia group the basic upperside wing pattern is black with white or yellowish bands and spots. The underside is brown and basally there is a red area marked with black stripes and spots. In the discal area there is a yellowish band with black stripes and veins. Females resemble Amauris butterflies. Both sexes lack tails.

The clade members are:
Papilio cyproeofila Butler, 1868
Papilio fernandus Fruhstorfer, 1903
Papilio filaprae Suffert, 1904
Papilio gallienus Distant, 1879
Papilio mechowi Dewitz, 1881
Papilio mechowianus Dewitz, 1885
Papilio nobicea Suffert, 1904
Papilio zenobia Fabricius, 1775

Description
It is very similar to Papilio gallienus but has cream-white rather than cream-yellow bands and these are not curved on the inner edge

References

External links
swallowtails.net Images
 Global Butterfly Information System Images (as subgenus Druryia)

cyproeofila
Butterflies described in 1868
Butterflies of Africa
Taxa named by Arthur Gardiner Butler